Hadja Lahbib (born 21 June 1970, Boussu, Wallonia, Belgium) is a Belgian journalist, TV presenter, director and politician, serving as the Minister of Foreign Affairs of Belgium since July 2022.

Early life 
Hadja Lahbib was born on 21 June 1970 in Boussu, near the city of Mons, to a family of Algerian origin.

Career as a journalist 
Lahbib graduated in journalism from the Free University of Brussels and worked for a long time for the Belgian Radio-Television of the French Community (RTBF). In particular, she was a special correspondent in Afghanistan and the Middle East, and presented the television news for two decades. In May 2013, she presented the final of the Queen Elisabeth Competition, but she refused explicitly to mention the winner had Israeli nationality. She was also trapped by her colleague who let her comment on a non-existing symphony.

Controversies 

Lahbib visited politically disputed Crimea between Russia and Ukraine in July 2021. She did not tell how exactly she got there and did not recognize Crimea as the territory of Ukraine. She went to the "Global Values" festival, which is organized by the Sevastopol Academic Russian Drama Theater named after Lunacharsky and organized by Katerina Tikhonova daughter of Vladimir Putin. In 2021, it was held on 23–25 July. On Instagram, she published fragments of a choreographic performance from the festival. After the trip, she was asked by RTBF was she coming back from Russia or Ukraine. Lahbib did not answer clearly, but said: "to land at Simferopol airport, you need a Russian visa."

Minister of Foreign Affairs of Belgium 

Prior to her appointment as foreign minister on 15 July 2022, Lahbib was only politically active with the socialist organisation, Solidaris, and she was not a member of the liberal Reformist Movement (MR), whose leader Georges-Louis Bouchez unexpectedly nominated her for the post of Belgian Federal Minister for Foreign Affairs to replace Sophie Wilmès. She took the oath before King Philippe on the same day. At the press conference at which she was introduced, she said about her political position:  After the interview, Georges-Louis Bouchez asked her to join MR, and she did so.

On 7 October 2022, Lahbib and two lawmakers – Darya Safai and Goedele Liekens – cut their hair in parliament, in solidarity with anti-government demonstrations in Iran triggered by the death in police custody of 22-year-old Mahsa Amini.

On 26 November 2022, Hahbib and prime minister Alexander De Croo visited Ukraine.

Works 
 Afghanistan. Le choix des femmes. Éditions Racine, Brüssel 2008, ISBN 978-2-87386-581-8; Documentary 2007 (52 min.)
 Le cou et la tête. – Documentary about the women's village Umoja in northern Kenya (26 min.)
 Patience, patience, t'iras au paradis ! Film 2014

References

External link 

|-

 

1970 births
Living people
Belgian directors
Belgian journalists
Belgian television presenters
Foreign ministers of Belgium
People from Boussu
Vrije Universiteit Brussel alumni
Belgian people of Algerian descent